USS Repose (AH-16) was a  in service with the United States Navy, active from May 1945 to January 1950, from October 1950 to December 1954, and from October 1965 to May 1970. After another five years in reserve, she was sold for scrap in 1975.

History
USS Repose (AH-16) was built as Marine Beaver, a type C4 class ship, in 1943 by Sun Shipbuilding & Drydock Co., Chester, Pennsylvania. She displaced 11,141 tons and had dimensions of 520 × 71.6 × 24 ft and a maximum speed of 18.7 knots. She was launched 8 August 1944; sponsored by Mrs. Pauline P. McIntire; and acquired for conversion to a hospital ship by Bethlehem Shipbuilding Corporation, in Brooklyn, New York. Upon completion of her conversion to navy use, she was commissioned 26 May 1945.

With a bed capacity of 750 and a complement of 564, the Repose departed Norfolk on 8 July 1945 for the Pacific. Serving as a casualty transport from various ports in the Pacific Ocean, the Repose also served as a base hospital ship in Shanghai and later Tsingtao, China, supporting the occupation forces in northern China. Repose remained in Asian waters, with an occasional return trip to the States until July 1949. She was decommissioned, in reserve, at San Francisco on 19 January 1950.

Repose was activated on 26 August 1950 and sailed for Pusan, Korea, picking up the navy crew in Yokosuka, Japan en route.  Serving in Korean waters and evacuating patients to Japanese ports as necessary, the Repose remained on station until early 1954 with a short repair period in San Francisco from February to March 1953 and the installation of a helicopter landing pad. She remained at the Long Beach Naval Shipyard until her transfer to the Naval Reserve Fleet on 27 September 1954; and she was decommissioned on 21 December 1954 at Hunters Point Naval Ship Yard.

After nearly 11 years in reserve at Suisun Bay, Repose was recommissioned on 16 October 1965 for service in Vietnam. Arriving on 3 January 1966, she was permanently deployed to Southeast Asia and earned the nickname "Angel of the Orient".  Operating mainly in the I Corps area, she treated over 9,000 battle casualties and 24,000 inpatients while deployed. Notably, USS Repose was on station during the 1967 USS Forrestal fire that killed 134 sailors and injured 161. Her medical staff also treated marksman Staff Sergeant Carlos Hathcock in September 1969 after he and seven other U.S. Marines suffered extensive burns from an anti-tank mine blast. The Repose departed Vietnam 14 March 1970 and was decommissioned in May 1970 and used as a hospital annex for Long Beach Naval Hospital. This proved uneconomical and she was sold for scrap in 1975.

Awards

Asiatic-Pacific Campaign Medal
World War II Victory Medal
China Service Medal
National Defense Service Medal with star
Korean Service Medal with nine battle stars 
Vietnam Service Medal with nine campaign stars
United Nations Service Medal
Republic of Vietnam Campaign Medal

References

 

 

1944 ships
Haven-class hospital ships
Ships built by the Sun Shipbuilding & Drydock Company
World War II auxiliary ships of the United States
Korean War auxiliary ships of the United States
Vietnam War auxiliary ships of the United States